This is a list of the candidates of the 2022 Victorian state election.

A record 742 candidates contested the 88 Legislative Assembly seats at the Victorian election on 26 November 2022, also including the supplementary election in Narracan on 28 January 2023. This overtook the previous record of 543 candidates in 2014 and was well up from 507 candidates in 2018. The 454 candidates for the Legislative Council is the highest number of upper house candidates in a Victorian election, up from 380 in 2018.

Retiring MPs
The following members have announced they are not contesting the upcoming election:

Labor
Luke Donnellan MLA (Narre Warren North) – lost preselection 13 December 2021
Nazih Elasmar MLC (Northern Metropolitan)
John Eren MLA (Lara) – announced 26 November 2021
Martin Foley MLA (Albert Park) – announced 23 June 2022
Mark Gepp MLC (Northern Victoria) – announced 2 December 2021
Danielle Green MLA (Yan Yean) – announced 24 November 2021
Dustin Halse MLA (Ringwood) – announced 24 November 2021
Jill Hennessy MLA (Altona) – announced 24 November 2021
Marlene Kairouz MLA (Kororoit) – lost preselection 13 December 2021
James Merlino MLA (Monbulk) – announced 23 June 2022
Frank McGuire MLA (Broadmeadows) – lost preselection 13 December 2021
Lisa Neville MLA (Bellarine) – announced 23 June 2022
Martin Pakula MLA (Keysborough) – announced 23 June 2022
Jaala Pulford MLC (Western Victoria) – announced 28 October 2022
Robin Scott MLA (Preston) – lost preselection 13 December 2021
Richard Wynne MLA (Richmond) – announced 25 November 2021

Liberal
Bruce Atkinson MLC (Eastern Metropolitan) – announced 9 June 2022
Gary Blackwood MLA (Narracan) – announced 9 November 2021
Neale Burgess MLA (Hastings) – announced 11 November 2021
Cathrine Burnett-Wake MLC (Eastern Victoria) – lost preselection 31 July 2022
David Morris MLA (Mornington) – lost preselection 10 December 2021
Craig Ondarchie MLC (Northern Metropolitan) – lost preselection 24 July 2022
Gordon Rich-Phillips MLC (South Eastern Metropolitan) – announced 17 June 2022
Tim Smith MLA (Kew) – announced 7 November 2021

National
Steph Ryan MLA (Euroa) – announced 5 July 2022

Independent
Russell Northe MLA (Morwell) – announced 26 July 2022

Legislative Assembly
Sitting members are shown in bold text. Successful candidates are highlighted in the relevant colour. Where there is possible confusion, an asterisk (*) is also used.

Legislative Council
Sitting members are shown in bold text. Tickets that elected at least one MLC are highlighted in the relevant colour. Successful candidates are identified by an asterisk (*).

Eastern Victoria
The Labor Party are defending two seats. The Liberal/National Coalition are defending two seats. The Shooters, Fishers and Farmers Party are defending one seat.

North Eastern Metropolitan
The Labor Party are defending two seats. The Liberal Party are defending two seats. The Transport Matters Party are defending one seat.

Northern Metropolitan
The Labor Party are defending two seats. The Liberal Party are defending one seat. The Greens are defending one seat. The Reason Party are defending one seat.

Northern Victoria
The Labor Party is defending two seats. The Liberal/National Coalition is defending one seat. Derryn Hinch's Justice Party is defending one seat. The Liberal Democratic Party is defending one seat.

South Eastern Metropolitan
The Labor Party is defending three seats, however MLC Adem Somyurek resigned his membership in 2020 and later sat as an independent, before resigning in 2022 after Parliament had finished for the term. He has since joined the DLP for whom he will run for in Northern Metropolitan.

The Liberal Party is defending one seat, however incumbent Gordon Rich-Phillips is retiring. The Liberal Democratic Party is defending one seat.

Southern Metropolitan
The Labor Party is defending two seats; however incumbent MLC Nina Taylor is contesting Albert Park for the party. The Liberal Party is defending two seats. Sustainable Australia is defending one seat.

Western Metropolitan
The Labor Party is defending three seats, however MLC Kaushaliya Vaghela was disendorsed and later sat as an independent. She is contesting this election for the New Democrats.

The Liberal Party is defending one seat, however MLC Bernie Finn was expelled from the party in May 2022, and later joined the Democratic Labour Party and is contesting this election for the party.

Derryn Hinch's Justice Party is defending one seat, however MLC Catherine Cumming defected from the party prior to taking her seat in the Legislative Council and later sat as an independent. She is contesting this election for the Angry Victorians Party

Western Victoria
The Labor Party is defending two seats, however incumbent Labor MLC Jaala Pulford retired close to the election. The Liberal/National Coalition is defending one seat. Derryn Hinch's Justice Party is defending one seat. The Animal Justice Party is defending one seat.

Notes
 Shaun Gilchrist, the Nationals candidate for the district of Narracan, died on 20 November 2022. This resulted in the election being declared as "failed" by the VEC, and a supplementary election was held on 28 January 2023 for which parties and candidates had to re-register. The original candidate list was: Justin Seddon (Labor), Wayne Farnham (Liberal), Shaun Gilchrist (Nationals), Alyssa Weaver (Greens), Laura Rees (AJP), Hannah Darts (Family First), Leonie Blackwell (Freedom), Casey Murphy (PHON), Tony Wolfe (Independent).

References

Candidates for Victorian state elections